The A7 motorway, also known as the Ploiești–Siret Motorway or the Moldavia Motorway, is a partially built motorway in Romania, that upon completion will link Ploiești to the north-eastern part of the country, partly along the Pan-European Corridor IX. It will run along the route: Buzău, Focșani, Bacău, Roman, Pașcani, and Suceava, connecting to Ukraine's M19 highway near Siret.

All other sections of the motorway are in various stages of planning, tendering and construction, with the first segments expected to be finished by 2024 the earliest.

The Pașcani – Siret section will be financed through EU funds, while the government wants the Ploiești – Pașcani section (excluding the Bacău bypass) to be financed through the Romanian PNRR (short for Planul Național de Redresare și Reziliență, part of the Next Generation EU package).

History
However, since 2014 plans in favor of a motorway past Focșani were scrapped in favor of a motorway towards Bacău, Suceava, and Siret termed A7. The motorway from Focșani to Albița (155 km) will have a different route number assigned and, as of April 2014, it was no longer a priority in the master plan for the national motorway network.

Sections

The first section, from Ploiești to Focșani (133 km), was proposed for a concession contract for tendering first half of 2013. No contract was signed, and the only section that has been tendered was the Bacău bypass (30.6 km, of which 16.2 km of motorway) in August 2013, but built at only half profile. It was awarded for construction in November 2013, but the results of the tender were contested by some of the participants. Later in 2014, the whole motorway was redesigned as an expressway that would later be expanded to full motorway specifications.

On 30 May 2016, the construction works at Bacău bypass started, and they were expected to be finished by 2022, but the contract with the Turkish company Eko İnşaat ve Ticaret was terminated in April 2017, due to financial difficulties of the constructor.

In December 2017, the Bacău bypass was reauctioned, this time as a full motorway section, and was awarded in December 2018, to the local based Spedition UMB – Tehnostrade joint venture, with the deadline in three years.

The Bacău bypass opened on 2 December 2020, with minor works, mainly to the protective elements and to one exit, remaining yet to be completed. All remaining works on the bypass and its branches were completed by August 2021. All other sections are in the feasibility study and technical project phase, with the exception of the motorway segments between Ploiești and Focșani via Buzău. The Ploiești - Buzău section (62 km) was auctioned for construction on 1 June 2021. On 1 February 2022, the Buzău bypass (4.6 km) and the Focșani bypass (10.9 km) were auctioned for construction, followed by the segments Buzău - Râmnicu Sărat (30.8 km) and Râmnicu Sărat - Focșani (36.1 km) on 8 February, same year, both on the Buzău - Focșani section (82.4 km).

On 7 June 2022, the segment between Mizil and Pietroasele (Ploiești - Buzău lot 2, 28.3 km) was awarded to the joint-venture Coni-Trace. 9 days later, on 16 June 2022, the segment between Ploiești and Mizil (Ploiești - Buzău lot 1, 21.0 km) was awarded to the joint-venture Impresa Pizzarotti-Retter. On 25 July 2022, the tender for the Bacău - Pașcani section (77.3 km) was launched, being divided into three lots: Bacău - Roman (lot 1, 30.3 km), Roman - Săbăoani (lot 2, 18.9 km), and Săbăoani - Pașcani (lot 3, 28.09 km). In August 2022, the tender for Focșani - Bacău launched as well, also divided into three lots: Focșani - Domnești-Târg (lot 1, 35.6 km), Domnești-Târg - Răcăciuni (lot 2, 38.78 km), and Răcăciuni - Bacău (lot 3, 21.52 km). On 6 September 2022, the Buzău bypass and the Focșani bypass were awarded to the joint-venture SA&PE-Spedition UMB-Tehnostrade.

The route of the Focșani bypass is notorious for its so-called "hump", backed by the local authorities of the city of Focșani on the grounds of an unapproved "general urban plan". The CNAIR tried unsuccessfully to convince the local authorities to support the variant of a straight route. Plans call that at Rădăuți (Milișăuți) the road towards Siret becomes an expressway, however this section is yet to have a route number assigned.

As of August 2022, lots 1 and 2 of the Ploiești - Buzău section are undergoing construction.

Openings timeline
2 December 2020: the Bacău bypass (16.2 km).

Exit list

See also
Roads in Romania
Transport in Romania

References

External links
CNADNR – Coridorul IX Ploiești - Albița

Motorways in Romania